Bravo is a supermarket chain with stores in the northeastern and southeastern United States. The store carries Krasdale Foods brands. The company's headquarters are in New York. It focuses on an Hispanic clientele. The company launched the El Sabor de tu Pais ("The Flavor of your Country") advertising campaign. In the early 1990s, many independently owned Bravo stores opened in New York City. Bravo is a midsize supermarket.

Bravo stopped advertising with the New York Daily News after the paper ran a series derogatory of supermarket chains in the city. Bravo later resumed advertising with the paper after the Daily News mended fences with the industry.

References

External links
Bravo supermarkets website
Krasdale Foods website

Supermarkets of the United States
Companies based in New York City
1991 establishments in New York City